The 8th British Academy Film Awards, given by the British Academy of Film and Television Arts in 1955, honored the best films of 1954.

Winners and nominees

Best Film
 Le Salaire de la peur 
The Caine Mutiny
Carrington V.C.
The Divided Heart
Doctor in the House
Executive Suite
For Better, For Worse
Hobson's Choice
How to Marry a Millionaire
Jigokumon
The Maggie
The Moon is Blue
On The Waterfront
Pane, amore e fantasia
The Purple Plain
Rear Window
Riot in Cell Block 11
Robinson Crusoe
Romeo and Juliet
Seven Brides for Seven Brothers

Best British Film
 Hobson's Choice 
Carrington V.C.
The Divided Heart
Doctor in the House
For Better, For Worse
The Maggie
The Purple Plain
Romeo and Juliet

Best Foreign Actor
 Marlon Brando in On The Waterfront 
José Ferrer in The Caine Mutiny
Fredric March in Executive Suite
James Stewart in The Glenn Miller Story
Neville Brand in Riot in Cell Block 11

Best British Actor
 Kenneth More in Doctor in the House 
David Niven in Carrington V.C.
John Mills in Hobson's Choice
Robert Donat in Lease of Life
Maurice Denham in The Purple Plain
Donald Wolfit in Svengali

Best British Actress
 Yvonne Mitchell in The Divided Heart 
Margaret Leighton in Carrington V.C.
Noelle Middleton in Carrington V.C.
Brenda De Banzie in Hobson's Choice
Audrey Hepburn in Sabrina

Best Foreign Actress
 Cornell Borchers in The Divided Heart 
Judy Holliday in Phffft!
Shirley Booth in About Mrs. Leslie
Grace Kelly in Dial M for Murder
Gina Lollobrigida in Pane, amore e fantasia

Best British Screenplay
 The Young Lovers - George Tabori and Robin Estridge 
The Divided Heart - Jack Whittingham
Doctor in the House - Nicholas Phipps
Hobson's Choice - David Lean, Norman Spencer and Wynyard Browne
The Maggie - William Rose
Monsieur Ripois - Hugh Mills and René Clément
The Purple Plain - Eric Ambler
Romeo and Juliet - Renato Castellani

Best Documentary Film
 The Great Adventure [Det Stora Ädventyret]

Most Promising Newcomer To Film
 David Kossoff in The Young Lovers 
Maggie McNamara in The Moon Is Blue
Eva Marie Saint in On The Waterfront

Best Animated Film
Arie Prerie

UN Award
The Divided Heart

Special Award
A Time Out of War

Film008
1954 film awards
1955 in British cinema
March 1955 events in the United Kingdom
1955 in London